The Low Millions are a pop-rock band from California.

Discography
 Ex-Girlfriends (2004)

Members
 Adam Cohen – vocals, guitar(singer/guitarist)
 Michael Chaves – vocals, guitar
 Jorgen Carlsson – vocals, bass
 Erik Eldenius – drums

References

External links

Filter Magazine's Artists to Watch - Low Millions

American pop rock music groups